Tan Chengxuan (born 3 July 1963) is a Chinese chess player.

He was a member of the Chinese national chess team. He was part of the national team at the Chess Olympiad in 1988. He played 1 game scoring 1 win, 0 draws and 0 losses.

His current (inactive) Elo rating is 2410 according to FIDE.

China Chess League
Tan Chengxuan played for Guangdong chess club in the China Chess League (CCL).

See also
Chess in China

References

External links
 
 
 
 

1963 births
Living people
Chinese chess players